Vasile Cijevschi (also credited as Cijevschii, Cijevski or Tchizhevsky; October 17, 1881 – July 14, 1931) was a Bessarabian and Romanian politician, administrator and writer. Originally a career officer in the Russian Empire, he was active within the ethnic Romanian political movement during the Russian Revolution, and later within the Moldavian Democratic Republic. Cijevschi helped organize the Republic's defense against bolshevik insurrection, and contributed to the Bessarabian–Romanian union of 1918.

Biography
Cijevschi was a native of Zaim village, Bender County, at the geographical center of the Bessarabian Governorate. His early career was in the Russian Cavalry, where he reached the rank of Rotmistr (Captain). He was involved in the Russo-Japanese War, when he also received academic training in Oriental studies and prepared for a career in Russian diplomacy. He was no longer in active service after the February Revolution of 1917, by which time he had become interested in political matters. In April, Cijevschi was registered as one of six Bessarabian envoys to the Congress of Russian Peoples of the Ukrainian People's Republic, where he prospected the emancipation of Romanians living under nominal Ukrainian rule. The National Moldavian Party elected him as one of the chief delegates.

By September 1917, Cijevschi was also involved with the Moldavian Congress of Chișinău, which called for Bessarabian autonomy within the Russian Republic. This institution elected Cijevschi as Commissar for Bessarabia, but, despite the efforts of Bessarabian lobbyists, his appointment was never sanctioned by the Russian Army Command in Mogilev. Shortly after the October Revolution, Cijevschi helped establish the All-Russian Congress of Moldavian Soldiers, functioning as the first legislative and executive body of Bessarabian autonomists. He was elected President of that Congress, with Ștefan Holban serving as his secretary. It was here that, in early November, the Rotmistr presented other delegates with the political options that resulted from self-determination—autonomy, (con)federation, and a unitary independent state. Cijevschi also issued orders for applying the ethnic criterion in education, setting aside funds for the "nationalization" of Bessarabian schools, and reprimanding the authorities of Akerman County for resisting this trend. Both he and Holban signed their names to a Congress proclamation on self-determination, which became legal precedent in the Moldavian Democratic Republic.

Following the legislative election of 1917, Cijevschi became a representative of Bender in the Bessarabian regional assembly, Sfatul Țării. Within this legislature, he presided upon an all-Romanian faction, the "Moldavian Bloc", which rivaled other ethnic community parties. In November, the Republic appointed Cijevschi Commissar of Bessarabian troops, which were enrolled against Bolshevik agitation. He applied his own philosophy in this respect: instead of creating an all-Romanian military structure, he gave a significant share to members of all ethnic communities. The undertrained republican army could not deal with the raids carried out by Russian deserters, and Cijevschi resigned his position on December 22. He returned to the legislative assembly, this time involved in debates with ethnic minority delegates over the adoption of Romanian as the Republic's official language. In February, Cijevschi wrote an article in Sfatuls eponymous newspaper, welcoming the creation of a Moldavian cultural society, Făclia. The piece also featured his instructions to Bessarabian intellectuals that they should combat Bolshevik agitation among the peasants.

At the height of a Romanian military intervention in Bessarabia, Cijevschi's Sfatul Țării campaigning helped swing the vote in favor of union with Romania—as proclaimed by the legislative body on April 9, 1918. Within Sfatul, Cijevschi was the one to read the act of union in its Russian translation. On the same day, he also initiated the election of Constantin Stere, the Bessarabian émigré, as honorary deputy for Soroca. However, once the Romanian administration took over, introducing centralizing legislation and De-Russification, Cijevschi supported a return to regional autonomy. With Nicolae Alexandri, Ion Păscăluță, Vasile Ghenzul, and several other Sfatul members, he issued a formal protest against the state of siege and demanded the reintroduction of Russia's Civil Code. Their memorandum was welcomed by the White émigré communities, who took it as proof that Bessarabia was still loyal to the defunct Russian Empire.

Cijevschi's parliamentary mandate expired on November 27, 1918. In April of the following year, he joined the Romanian League, formed around the conservative Vladimir Herța; it attempted to mount opposition to the more left-wing Bessarabian Peasants' Party, but finally presented no candidates in the general election of November 1919 (except in Cahul County). After this episode, Cijevschi withdrew from national politics. Still involved with the Moldavian Veterans' Association, and employed for a while by the Chișinău Community Bank, he worked mainly as a civil servant for the Mayor of Chișinău, supervising the local schools. His activity was primarily focused on the Art Academy, which he helped refurbish. Under his watch, the school employed educators who were frowned upon in Romania for their alleged communist sympathies. He dabbled in fiction writing: the short story Unei prietene ("To a Lady Friend") was published by Viața Basarabiei magazine in 1934.

During the 1920s Cijevschi rallied with the People's Party, and edited its regional Russian-language newspaper, Nashe Slovo ("Our Word"). As a speaker of "Oriental languages", he was asked to review the archeological finds at Galilești, but could not read the mysterious inscriptions. He was also involved as head editor of three other publications, Gazeta-Lei, Bessarabskaya Mysl and Onisifor Ghibu's România Nouă. He died on July 14, 1931, and was buried at the "Armenesc" Central Cemetery, Chișinău. Cijevschi was posthumously honored at the 20th anniversary of Bessarabian autonomy in 1937. His native village of Zaim is now home to a Vasile Cijevschi Public Library.

Notes

References
 Vitalie Ciobanu, "Directoratul general de război și marină al Basarabiei (1917–1918)", in the Moldovan Ministry of Defense Cohorta. Revistă de Istorie Militară, Issue 1/2007, p. 93-102
Ion Constantin, Gherman Pântea între mit și realitate. Bucharest: Editura Biblioteca Bucureștilor, 2010. 
Diana Vrabie, Unirea din 1918 în presa din regiunea Moldovei (Basarabia). Iași: Asachiana, 2018.  
Duiliu Zamfirescu, Ioan Adam, În Basarabia. Bucharest: Editura Bibliotecii Bucureștilor, 2012. 

Romanian people of Moldovan descent
Military personnel of the Moldavian Democratic Republic
Russian military personnel of the Russo-Japanese War
Russian military personnel of World War I
National Moldavian Party politicians
Moldovan MPs 1917–1918
Romanian civil servants
People's Party (interwar Romania) politicians
20th-century Romanian politicians
Romanian newspaper editors
Romanian newspaper founders
Moldovan newspaper editors
Male journalists
Moldovan newspaper founders
Romanian male short story writers
20th-century Romanian male writers
Romanian short story writers
20th-century Moldovan writers
Moldovan short story writers
People from Căușeni District
1881 births
1931 deaths